The Provisional People's Representative Council was the first Indonesian legislature under the Provisional Constitution of 1950. The council was formed after the transition of Indonesia to a unitary state on 17 August 1950. The council initially consisted of 236 members, with 213 members remaining prior to the dissolution of the council in 1956.

History 
On 14 August 1950, three days prior to the dissolution of the United States of Indonesia, the People's Representative Council and the Senate of the United States of Indonesia approved the draft of the Provisional Constitution of 1950. Accordingly, on 15 August 1950, the council and the senate held a joint meeting, in which Sukarno read the Charter of the Establishment of the Unitary State of the Republic of Indonesia. The charter officially abolished the United States of Indonesia, and formed the Republic of Indonesia effective from 17 August 1950. Thus, the charter officially dissolved the federal legislative and the senate, and a unicameral legislative for Indonesia was formed.

The second article of the Constitution of the United States of Indonesia, which came into force on 27 December 1949, stated that the "sovereignty of the Republic of Indonesia is vested in the people and is exercised by the government together with the People's Representative Council".

Based on this constitution, the speaker of the council, Sartono, held the first session of the People's Representative Council at the former Sociëteit Concordia building in Jakarta. After the building was renovated, the building was renamed  the Parliament Building. However, after the opening ceremony, the building was not yet ready for use. Thus, the meetings of the People's Representative Council were held at the upper level of the Hotel des Indes.

Speaker and deputy speaker 
Article 62 of the constitution stated that the speaker of the People's Representative Council should be elected from and by the members of the council. The speaker should be assisted by several deputy speakers, to be also elected by the same procedure as the speaker. These elections required the confirmation by the President. The constitution also stated that prior to such confirmation by the President, the oldest member would temporarily preside over the meeting.

Under this rule, Rajiman Wediodiningrat, the oldest member of the council at 71 years of age, was appointed to preside over the first session of the council, which was to elect the speaker and deputy speaker.

On 19 August 1950, the session to elect the speaker and deputy speaker concluded with Sartono as the speaker, and Albert Mangaratua Tambunan, Arudji Kartawinata, Tadjuddin Noor, as the deputy speakers. The president confirmed the results of the election on 21 August 1950.

Vice-presidential election 
According to  article 45 of the constitution, the president and the vice-president were elected in accordance with rules to be laid down by law, but for the first time, the vice-president was appointed by the president upon the recommendation submitted by the People's Representative Council. Based on this, the council held an election for the prospective vice-president to be submitted for recommendation on 14 October 1950.

During the elections, seven MPs from the Communist Party of Indonesia walked out. In a letter to the speaker, these MPs stated that the vice-presidential election was unnecessary.

Membership

Requirements 
Unlike the previous Central Indonesian National Committee, the council had a strict set of provisions regarding the membership of the council. These provisions were drawn up according to Chapter 2 and 3 of the constitution. According to this constitution, members of the People's Representative Council had to be at least 25 years old, and their rights to vote and to be elected must not have been revoked.

Composition 

Article 77 of the Constitution stated that "...the People's Representative Council shall for the first time and until it is established by
elections in accordance with the law, consist of the chairman, deputy chairmen, and members of the People's Representative Council of the United States of Indonesia; the speaker, deputy speaker and members of the Senate; the speaker, deputy speaker and members of
the Central Indonesian National Committee and the speaker, deputy speaker and members of the Supreme Advisory Council. Thus, the council consisted of 148 members from the DPR-RIS, 29 members from the Senate, 46 members from the KNIP, and 13 members from the Supreme Advisory Council.

The constitution did not give the president the authority to add other members, as the government took the view that it was too difficult to determine the criteria by which such members would be appointed. Several years after the formation of the council, there were 213 members remaining, with 23 members having died or resigned. To restore the membership, the government enacted  Law No. 37/1953, which provided for the replacement of members who had resigned or died. By the end of 1954, there were 235 members. Muchammad Enoch, a legislator who had resigned from the Parki party, was not replaced by his party, thus leaving one seat empty.

There were 21 factions in the council; 16 of which consisted of single parties, 4 consisted of organizations, and one (National Progressive) was a coalition. There were also three short-lived factions, the People's Sovereignty Faction, the Labor Faction, and the Women's Faction. The latter was not actually a faction; it was rather a coalition of seven women MPs. Eleven MPs were not affiliated to any faction.

Bibliography

References 

Politics of Indonesia